Colleen House (March 17, 1952 – December 24, 2022) was an American politician who served as a member of the Michigan House of Representatives, from 1974 to 1976 and 1983 to 1986.

Early life and education
House was born in Bay City, Michigan, on March 17, 1952, to parents James Daniel and Kathleen House.

House graduated from All Saints Central High School in 1969. House earned a B.A. in political science from Michigan State University in 1973.

Career
House was elected to the Michigan House of Representatives in a special election in 1974. House represented the 101st district until December 31, 1976. On November 2, 1982, House was again elected to the Michigan House of Representatives where she represented the 99th district from January 12, 1983, to December 31, 1986.

Personal life and death
In 1975, House married state representative John Engler in Bay City. In 1986, House and Engler divorced. In 2002, House married Newsmax political columnist and White House correspondent, John Gizzi. House was Roman Catholic.

House died from complications with dementia at her home in Washington, D.C., on December 24, 2022, at the age of 70.

References

1952 births
2022 deaths
Catholics from Michigan
Politicians from Bay City, Michigan
Michigan State University alumni
Women state legislators in Michigan
Republican Party members of the Michigan House of Representatives
Spouses of Michigan politicians
20th-century American women politicians
20th-century American politicians
21st-century American women